International College, a small, private, non-traditional and unaccredited college, was founded in Los Angeles in the early 1970s by Linden G. Leavitt. It was licensed to issue degrees by the California State Department of Education and its degrees were recognized by several dozen other schools - reportedly including Harvard and Johns Hopkins - but its attempts to attain accreditation never came to fruition. The college was reported to have 174 students in 1978 and 350 students in 1980. It had no classrooms, libraries or laboratories, but its administrative offices were located at 1019 Gayley Avenue in Los Angeles. It ceased operations in 1986 and its students were transferred to another unaccredited college, William Lyon University.  Operating in the pre-internet period, the college had a business model that was ahead of its time.

As its motto, In Vestigiis Institutorum Antiquorum indicated, the college followed the methods of the first universities, where students were paired with outstanding tutors.  Students could earn credit studying at different universities before completing their dissertation.   Many of the works of its students were published by the College under the imprint Guild of Tutors Press.

In the area of economics, the late Dr. Hans F. Sennholz was one of the tutors who participated over many years, graduating students of renown in the field of economic education and public policy. One example is Alejandro Chafuen, president and CEO of Atlas Economic Research Foundation since 1991 and president and founder of the Hispanic American Center of Economic Research. Another is Juan Carlos Cachanosky, a renowned professor in Argentina and Guatemala.

Also in the field of economics, Robert L. Bradley, Jr., founder of the Institute for Energy Research received his degree from leading libertarian theorist Murray N. Rothbard.

The college had a worldwide faculty of tutors in other areas as well, such as: Leonard Bernstein in music; Anaïs Nin in writing; Buckminster Fuller in Design Science; Yehudi Menuhin in Music; Kenneth Rexroth in Poetry; Sulvain Auroux in the Philosophy of Science; Linguistics, and Philosophy; Dr. Arthur Lerner in Poetry Therapy; Lehman Engel in Musical Theory; Dr. Norman Feingold in Counseling Psychology; Dr. Anne de Vore in Transpersonal Psychology; Dr. Nick Warren in Physics; Dr. Melinda Lorenz in Art History; Dr. Bruce Weber in Biochemistry; Dr. Peter Warshall in Natural History; Dr. Edward de Bono in Education and Psychology; Dr. John Seeley in Behavioral Science; Dr. Russell Lockhart in The Analytical and Archetypal Psychology of C.G.Jung; Dr. Hal Stone in Clinical Psychology; and Dr. Frederick Burwick in Literature and the Natural Sciences.

References

 Crittenden, Jack. "Places," REVISION: A Journal of Knowledge and Consciousness, Spring 1978, p. 77.
 Ferderber, Skip. "'Dream Faculty' to Guide College Study," Los Angeles Times, March 10, 1974
 Hendrickson, Mark. "At IC You Pick Your Tutor and Hope that he Picks You," The Christian Science Monitor, March 30, 1981, B18.
 Johnson, Sharon. "School of Tutors Uses the World As Campus," New York Times, September 7, 1980, p. 6 EDUC
 Kirk, Russell. Decadence and Renewal in the Higher Learning: An Episodic History of American University and College since 1953 *South Bend, Ind.: Gateway Editions, LTD, 1978)
 Kirk, Russell. "Master and Scholars," National Review, September 27, 1974, p. 1108.
 Japenga, Ann. "An Educational Catalyst for Independent Scholars," Los Angeles Times, January 6, 1983, Part V, p. 1. (Also a title: CATALYST: Support for Independent Scholars)
 Japenga, Ann. "One-on-One at International College," Los Angeles Times,  DO NOT HAVE DATE OR PAGE
 Scully, Malcolm. "A College that's Reviving the Tutor-Student Tradition," The Chronicle of Higher Education, October 28, 1975, vol XI, No. 7, 3.
 Werther, Betty. "Alternative to the Conventional University," International Herald Tribune, June 21, 1974

Universities and colleges in Los Angeles County, California
Educational institutions established in 1970
Educational institutions disestablished in 1986
Defunct private universities and colleges in California